Tagart is a surname. Notable people with the surname include:

 Edward Tagart (1804–1858), English Unitarian minister
 Noel Tagart (1878–1913), English cricketer

See also
 Taggart